László Horváth (born April 24, 1962) is a Hungarian politician, member of the National Assembly (MP) for Pétervására then Gyöngyös (Heves County Constituency II). Formerly he also served as Member of Parliament (1990–1994; 1998–2006).

Personal life
He is married. His wife is Ágnes Horváthné Lőrincz. They have a son together, Dávid.

References

1962 births
Living people
Alliance of Free Democrats politicians
Fidesz politicians
Members of the National Assembly of Hungary (1990–1994)
Members of the National Assembly of Hungary (1998–2002)
Members of the National Assembly of Hungary (2002–2006)
Members of the National Assembly of Hungary (2010–2014)
Members of the National Assembly of Hungary (2014–2018)
Members of the National Assembly of Hungary (2018–2022)
Members of the National Assembly of Hungary (2022–2026)
People from Esztergom